List of K-pop albums on the Billboard charts is a compilation of weekly chart information for K-pop music published by the Billboard charts, and reported on by Billboard K-Town, an online Billboard column. This is a list of K-pop albums, EPs and releases by K-pop artists on the Billboard charts.

2009–present
This list depends on continual updates taken from * and *.
 Charts with all updates 2009–present are marked (Complete).
Billboard artists comprehensive update incomplete.
Billboard charts comprehensive update incomplete.
The list is currently minus portions of Psy performance on 58 charts.
The list is exclusive of Korea K-Pop Hot 100 data.
Figures in red highlight indicate the highest rating received by K-pop artists on that chart.
 – Current week's charting

Billboard 200 (Complete)

Canadian Albums

Catalog Albums
previously called Top Pop Catalog Albums
Chart started 1991-05-25

Dance/Electronic Albums
also called Top Dance/Electronic Albums

Digital Albums
Chart discontinued after 2020-01-18

Heatseekers Albums (Complete)
Chart reduced from 50 to 25 on 2014-12-20.

Heatseekers Albums (East North Central)
Chart discontinued after 2020-01-18

Heatseekers Albums (Middle Atlantic)
Chart discontinued after 2020-01-18

Heatseekers Albums (Mountain)
Chart discontinued after 2020-01-18

Heatseekers Albums (Northeast)
Chart discontinued after 2020-01-18

Heatseekers Albums (Pacific)
Chart discontinued after 2020-01-18

Heatseekers Albums (South Atlantic)
Chart discontinued after 2020-01-18

Heatseekers Albums (South Central)
Chart discontinued after 2020-01-18

Heatseekers Albums (West North Central)
Chart discontinued after 2020-01-18

Independent albums (Complete)

Internet Albums
Chart discontinued after 2020-01-18

Rap Album Sales
Chart discontinued after 2020-01-18

Soundtrack Album Sales
Chart discontinued after 2020-01-18

Soundtracks (Complete)

Tastemakers

Top Album Sales

Top Current Album Sales
 Chart started 2009-12-05.

Top Rap Albums (Complete)

World Albums (Complete)
 Chart started 1990-05-19 and lists top 15 only
 No K-pop listings in 2009

See also
 List of K-pop on the Billboard charts
 List of K-pop songs on the Billboard charts
 List of K-pop on the Billboard year-end charts
 Timeline of K-pop at Billboard
 Timeline of K-pop at Billboard in the 2020s
 Korea K-Pop Hot 100
 List of K-Pop concerts held outside Asia
 List of male K-pop artists
 List of female K-pop artists
 List of South Korean idol groups

Notes

References

External links
Billboard popular charts
Billboard complete artist/chart search - subscription only

Billboard album charts
K-pop albums
 
South Korean music-related lists
2009 in South Korean music
2010 in South Korean music
2011 in South Korean music
2012 in South Korean music
2013 in South Korean music
2014 in South Korean music
2015 in South Korean music
2016 in South Korean music
2017 in South Korean music
2018 in South Korean music
2019 in South Korean music
2020 in South Korean music
2000s in South Korean music
2010s in South Korean music
2020s in South Korean music